Frankenthal Hauptbahnhof is the main railway station for the city of Frankenthal in the German state of Rhineland-Palatinate and is located on the Mainz–Ludwigshafen railway. It is classified by Deutsche Bahn as a category 3 station. Besides Frankenthal Hauptbahnhof the only other station in Frankenthal are Frankenthal Süd and Flomersheim.

Location

The station is centrally located in the city of Frankenthal. The station is served by various lines and is the terminus of the Freinsheim–Frankenthal line. In the station there is a bakery, a kiosk and a newsagent.

History
In November 1853, the Hessian Ludwig Railway completed the section of the Mainz–Ludwigshafen line from the Palatine Ludwig Railway to the Hessian border in Frankenthal. The station in Frankenthal was built initially as a temporary structure. By 1860 the line was between Worms and Ludwigshafen am Rhein was duplicated. The official inauguration of the permanent Frankenthal station was held on 15 November 1870. The Freinsheim–Frankenthal line opened to the station on 15 October 1877.

From 1891 to 1939, the metre gauge Frankenthal–Großkarlbach Local Railway (Lokalbahn Ludwigshafen–Großkarlbach) ran from the station to Großkarlbach. From 1890 to 1933, the Ludwigshafen–Frankenthal Local Railway (Lokalbahn Ludwigshafen–Frankenthal) ran to Ludwigshafen. South of the station there was a connection between the local railways and the standard gauge railway to allow the transhipment of freight.

The upgrade of the station started in 2014: platforms 1 and 2 were raised to a height of 76 cm, platform 3a to a height of 55 cm, the platform furniture was renewed, two passenger lifts were built and a station building and travel centre were built. During the construction work there was a dispute between the Deutsche Bahn and the municipality of Frankenthal in relation the width of the platform on track 2. Deutsche Bahn reduced the width of the platform due to underground cables, which was criticised by the municipality.

Architecture
The first station building, which opened in 1870, was similar with its round arched windows and its clock tower to the station building of the former Ludwigshafen terminal station. After the Second World War, a new building was built in the style of the 1950s.

Plans
The Rhine-Neckar S-Bahn will run here from the timetable change of December 2021.

Rail services 
The three platform tracks of Frankenthal station are over 300 m long and still have a height of 76 cm and provide barrier-free access to the trains. The station is served by services on two Regional-Express and two Regionalbahn lines.

References

External links

Railway stations in Rhineland-Palatinate
Hauptbahnof
Railway stations in Germany opened in 1870